Uyady (Uyaźı) is a rural locality (a village) in Angasyakovsky Selsoviet, Dyurtyulinsky District, Bashkortostan, Russia. The population was 3 as of 2010. There is only 1 street.

Geography 
Uyady is located 28 km north of Dyurtyuli (the district's administrative centre) by road. Iskush is the nearest rural locality.

References 

Rural localities in Dyurtyulinsky District